Bradford Moor is a ward in the metropolitan borough of the City of Bradford, West Yorkshire, England.  It contains six listed buildings that are recorded in the National Heritage List for England.  All the listed buildings are designated at Grade II, the lowest of the three grades, which is applied to "buildings of national importance and special interest".  The ward is to the east of the centre of Bradford, and includes the districts of Laisterdyke and Thornbury.  It is mainly residential, and the listed buildings consist of a farmhouse and farm buildings, a chaplaincy with an attached stable block and coach house, a former Sunday school, and two rows of terraced cottages.


Buildings

References

Citations

Sources

Lists of listed buildings in West Yorkshire
Listed